Imre Dávid (born 4 June 1944) is a Hungarian rower. He competed in the men's eight event at the 1972 Summer Olympics.

References

External links
 

1944 births
Living people
Hungarian male rowers
Olympic rowers of Hungary
Rowers at the 1972 Summer Olympics
Rowers from Budapest